Notable people with the given name Benson:
Benson Abounu (born 1949), Deputy Governor of Benue State, Nigeria
Benson Barus (born 1980), Kenyan long-distance runner in marathon and half marathon competitions
Benson Dillon Billinghurst (B.D. Billinghurst), American educator in Nevada during the early 20th century
Benson K. Buffham (born 1919), American intelligence official, deputy director of the National Security Agency
Benson Deng, South Sudanese writer and one of the Lost Boys of Sudan
Benson Farb (born 1967), American mathematician 
Benson Fong (1916–1987), American character actor
Benson Gicharu (born 1985), Kenyan amateur boxer
Benson Henderson (born 1983), American mixed martial artist
Benson E. Hill (1795–1845), English writer, soldier and epicure
Benson W. Hough (1875–1935), United States federal judge
Benson Hunt, Samoan footballer
Benson Idahosa (1938–1998), Charismatic Pentecostal preacher, founder of the Church of God Mission International
Benson Idonije (born 1936), Nigerian broadcaster and music critic
Benson Mbai Itwiku, Kenyan politician
George Benson Johnston (1913–2004), Canadian poet
Michelle Elizabeth Benson Keegan (born 1987), English actress
Benson Koech (born 1974), Kenyan middle distance runner
Benson Leavitt (1797–1869), American businessman, alderman and acting mayor of Boston, Massachusetts
Benson Lee (born 1969), Korean-American filmmaker
Benson Everett Legg (born 1947), former United States District Judge, Maryland
Benson John Lossing (1813–1891), American historian and writer
Isaac Benson Lucas, KC (1867–1940), Canadian lawyer and politician
Willis Benson Machen (1810–1893), Democratic U.S. Senator from Kentucky
Benson Masya (1970–2003), Kenyan long-distance runner
Benson Mates (1919–2009), American philosopher
Benson Mayowa (born 1991), American football defensive end
Benson Mhlongo (born 1980), South African football defender and midfielder
Benson Mulomba (born 1949), Zambian middle-distance runner
Benson Mwita (born 1987), Tanzanian cricketer
Benson Y. Parkinson (born 1960), American Mormon novelist, literary critic and biographer
Benson Seurei (born 1984), Kenyan-born Bahraini middle-distance runner
Benson Shilongo (born 1992), Namibian international footballer
Benson Stanley (born 1984), Australian rugby union player
Benson Taylor, FRSA (born 1983), English composer, record producer, electronic musician and humanitarian
Benson Wairegi (born 1953), accountant, banker, businessman and entrepreneur in Kenya
Peter Benson Walker (1922–1987), Australian politician
Benson Whitney (born 1956), United States Ambassador to Norway from 2006 to 2009
Benson Wood (1839–1915), U.S. Representative from Illinois

English masculine given names